Lupercio Leonardo de Argensola (baptised 14 December 1559 – 2 March 1613) was a Spanish dramatist and poet.

Biography
He  was born  in Barbastro. He was educated at the universities of Huesca and Zaragoza, becoming secretary to the duke de Villahermosa in 1585. He was appointed historiographer of Aragon in 1599, and in 1610 accompanied the count de Lemos to Naples, where he died in March 1613.

His tragedies—Fills, Isabela and Alejandra—are said by Cervantes to have "filled all who heard them with admiration, delight and interest". Filis is lost, and Isabela and Alejandra, which were not printed till 1772, are imitations of Seneca.

Argensola's poems were published with those of his brother, Bartolomé Leonardo de Argensola, in 1634; they consist of translations from the Latin poets, and of original satires.

Notes

References

External links

 
 

1559 births
1613 deaths
People from Barbastro
Spanish poets
Spanish dramatists and playwrights
Spanish male dramatists and playwrights
Spanish male poets
University of Zaragoza alumni